Julien Dray (born 5 March 1955 in Oran, French Algeria) is a French politician. He is a member of the French Socialist Party, member of the regional council of Île-de-France and was a member of the National Assembly of France between 1988 and 2012. He was a Trotskyist activist till 1981 and a cofounder with his friend Harlem Désir of SOS Racisme, of which he was vice president from 1984 to 1988.

Works
SOS génération, Ramsay, 1987
Lettres d'un député de base à ceux qui nous gouvernent, Flammarion, 1989
La Guerre qu'il ne fallait pas faire, Albin Michel, 1991
Les Clairons de Maastricht (with Gérard Filoche), Ramsay, 1992
De la gauche en général et de l'archaïsme en particulier, Belfond, 1994
Chronique d'une différence (with François Baroin and Pierre Doncieux), Editions 1, 1998
Sept jours dans la vie d'Attika (with Harlem Désir, Gérard Filoche, Marie-Noëlle Lienemann and Jean-Luc Mélenchon), Ramsay, 2000
État de violence, 2002
Comment peut-on encore être socialiste ?, Grasset, 2003
Règlement de comptes, Hachette Littératures, 2007
Et maintenant ?, Le cherche midi, 2008
La fin des Vingt perverses, Betapolitique, 2008

References

External links
 Julien Dray (Assemblée nationale)
 Juliendray.com
 Juliendray.blogspot.com/

1955 births
Living people
People from Oran
Politicians from Île-de-France
Pieds-Noirs
Revolutionary Communist League (France) politicians
Socialist Party (France) politicians
Deputies of the 12th National Assembly of the French Fifth Republic
Deputies of the 13th National Assembly of the French Fifth Republic
Sorbonne Paris North University alumni
21st-century French Sephardi Jews
French people of Algerian-Jewish descent